Octopodoidea is a superfamily of the suborder Incirrata containing all extant octopods except for the cirrate octopodes, argonauts (Alloposidae, Argonautidae, Ocythoidae and Tremoctopodidae), and the vampire squid.

Families 
 Suborder Incirrina
Superfamily Argonautoidea
Superfamily Octopodoidea
Family Amphitretidae
subfamily Bolitaeninae
subfamily Vitreledonellinae
Family Bathypolypodidae
Family Eledonidae
Family Enteroctopodidae
Family Megaleledonidae
Family Octopodidae

References

Octopuses